The Lady from Longacre is a lost 1921 American silent drama film directed by George Marshall and starring William Russell, Mary Thurman and Mathilde Brundage. It is based on the 1918 novel The Lady from Long Acre by Victor Bridges, later remade as the 1925 film Greater Than a Crown

Synopsis
Hoping to escape an arranged marriage Princess Isabel escapes to England where she falls in love with Lord Anthony Conway.

Cast
 William Russell as Lord Anthony Conway
 Mary Thurman as Princess Isabel / Molly Moncke
 Mathilde Brundage as Lady Jocelyn
 Robert Klein as Count de Se
 Jean De Briac as Ex-King Pedro
 Francis Ford as 	Count de Freitas
 William Brunton as Tiger Bugg
 Douglas Gerrard as Sir Henry 
 Lillian Worth as Lady Laura
 Arthur Van Sickle as Spaulding
 Louis Dumar as Count Cognasto

References

Bibliography
 Connelly, Robert B. The Silents: Silent Feature Films, 1910-36, Volume 40, Issue 2. December Press, 1998.
 Munden, Kenneth White. The American Film Institute Catalog of Motion Pictures Produced in the United States, Part 1. University of California Press, 1997.
 Solomon, Aubrey. The Fox Film Corporation, 1915-1935: A History and Filmography. McFarland, 2011.

External links
 

1921 films
1921 drama films
1920s English-language films
American silent feature films
Silent American drama films
American black-and-white films
Fox Film films
Films directed by George Marshall
Novels set in London
Films based on British novels
1920s American films